In Other Worlds is a 1985 novel by American writer A. A. Attanasio, the second in his Radix Tetrad.  It contains humans, zōtl, Rimstalkers, other spatial dimensions, and time-travel/temporal distortion as do other novels in the Radix series, though they are re-envisioned.

Plot 

Carl Schirmer's life is transformed when he is turned into energy by an eighth-dimensional being and transported to a faraway world at the edge of a black hole.

What follows is a thrilling ride similar to Flash Gordon involving a woman from the end of time, a man who can live off sunlight, and an alternate, paradisaical Earth in which World War II never happened.

Characters
Carl Schirmer:  An everyman who is abducted and transformed by the Eld Skyle.  A reluctant hero who soon learns to wield a laser baton, fly a rocket ship, and find true love.
Eld Skyle:  An eighth-dimensional life-form who feeds on the imperfections of other life-forms, transforming them into idealized versions of their former selves.
Evoë:  A denizen of the strange world the Eld Skyle brings Carl to.
Zee:  A friend of Carl's who discovers key secrets to the universe.

External links

1985 American novels
American science fiction novels
1985 science fiction novels